Moose River is a community in the Canadian province of Nova Scotia, located in Cumberland County.

References

Moose River on Destination Nova Scotia

Communities in Cumberland County, Nova Scotia
General Service Areas in Nova Scotia